Xiangning "Forrest" Zhang 张向宁 (born in 1972) is a Chinese information technology entrepreneur, angel investor, and venture capitalist. He is among the first group of Internet entrepreneurs in China, and also the founder, former Chairman and CEO of HiChina Corporation (WWW.NET.CN) as well as the Chairman and CEO of Tixa Internet Technology Corporation. Zhang foresaw the potential of the Internet and provided domain name registration and web hosting services from the end of 1995, leading HiChina to earn the largest share of the Chinese market in this field. Later he started his second company, Tixa, and continued to innovate while holding positions in organizations like the All-China Youth Federation and the China Council for International Investment Promotion.

Early life
Zhang enrolled in Beijing Normal University at 16 years old. His paper on the Principle of Relativity written at 17 years old impressed a professor at the Massachusetts Institute of Technology (MIT), but shortly afterwards, he willingly stopped schooling at 18 years old.

Professional life
Between 1990 and 1994, Zhang went on to experience the role of a regular staff member and the transition from failure to success in founding businesses. Over that period, Zhang gained operation experience and a deep understanding of corporate management. His work expanded through industries such as international trade, shipping, tourism, bid management, equipment development, computer exhibition, and more. At 22 years old, Zhang became one of the few Chinese youth entrepreneurs..

In 1994, Zhang foresaw the potential of the Internet. Initially interested in the Bulletin Board System (BBS), he started to create one of his own. He eventually decided to suspend all of his other businesses and focus on the Internet industry.

At the end of 1995, Zhang founded HiChina Co. (Chinese: 万网), which was to become the largest domain name registration and web hosting service company in China. As the Chairman and CEO, Zhang led the startup company to grow from ten to thousands of staff members.

In January 2000, Zhang initiated the "Net.cn Plan", associating with Sina, Sohu, NetEase, Changhong, Kelon, Computer World, China Info World (CIW), China Internet Network Information Center, China Information Association, and 37 other notable companies and organizations, and created the "Zhong Guo Qi Ye Shang Wang Fu Wu Lian Meng" (Translated as: Internet Services for China Businesses Alliance). Zhang also announced that the year 2000 would be China's "Qi Ye Shang Wang Nian" (Translated as: Year of Internet Utilization for Businesses).

During HiChina's development, Zhang led HiChina through two rounds of equity trades with major investors including IDG Ventures, TPG Newbridge, and more.

In 1998, Zhang completed his Master's degree at Huazhong University of Science and Technology.

In November 2001, Zhang chose to abdicate his position, only remaining as a shareholder, and collaborated with his long-time friends to found a new company "VeryE.com". VeryE would create a brand new Internet business model, making the Internet more practical.

In February 2004, VeryE obtained investment from Sumitomo Mitsui Banking Corporation, Japan Asia Investment Co. (JAIC), MIH Investments, and became Tixa Co. (WWW.TIXA.COM).

In September 2009, Alibaba acquired HiChina and later built it into Alibaba Cloud (Aliyun), maintaining its position as the top domain name registration and web hosting service company in China.

Major investment projects
 Visual China 视觉中国
 XiMaLaYa FM 喜马拉雅
 ShenZhouRong 神州融
 Hylanda 海量信息
 HeYinLiang 合音量
 ...

Other positions
 Investment and Financing Committee (CIFC)
 Distinguished Guest of the China Internet Conference
 ...

Honors and awards
 Tixa Co. – Top 100 Innovative Companies in Asia (2005, Red Herring Asia)
 Tixa Co. – Top 50 Innovative Companies in the Internet Industry (2005, Internet Society of China)
 Best Investors in China (2006, Forbes)
 Most Influential Angel Investors in China (2007, The 1st China PE Influence Awards)
 Most Active Angel Investors in China (2007)

References

1972 births
Living people
Businesspeople from Beijing
Beijing Normal University alumni
Huazhong University of Science and Technology alumni
Chinese venture capitalists
People in information technology